The Jewish Supernumerary Police (Hebrew: Shotrim Musafim), sometimes referred to as Jewish Auxiliary Police, were a branch of the Guards (Notrim) set up by the British in the British Mandate of Palestine in June 1936. 

The British authorities gradually expanded the Supernumerary Police from 6,000 to 14,000 and ultimately 22,000. Those trained became the nucleus of the Haganah, which itself became the main constituent of the Israel Defense Forces during the 1948 Arab-Israeli War. 

The other branch of the Notrim was an élite mobile force, created in 1938, known as the Jewish Settlement Police.

See also
 Notrim

Footnotes

References
Bowyer Bell, John (1996). Terror Out of Zion. Transaction Publishers. 
Nasr, Kameel B. (1996). Arab and Israeli Terrorism: The Causes and Effects of Political Violence, 1936-1993. McFarland & Company. 

Law enforcement in Mandatory Palestine
Haganah units
1936–1939 Arab revolt in Palestine